Sergei Voronov (born 5 February 1971) is a Russian former professional hockey defenseman who was active from 1992 until 2008. Voronov was drafted by the Pittsburgh Penguins in the 1995 NHL Entry Draft, selected in the eighth round (206th overall).

Career
Voronov started his career with HC Dynamo Moscow, playing three years with the club before being drafted by the Pittsburgh Penguins in the 1995 NHL Entry Draft. Voronov attended Pittsburgh Penguins training camp and was initially assigned to the Penguins' IHL affiliate in Cleveland, but after two games with the Lumberjacks he was reassigned to the Penguins' ECHL affiliate in Hampton Roads. After a solid rookie season where Voronov led all Admirals' defensemen with a +24, Voronov quickly fell out of favor with the Admirals, with assistant coach Al MacIssac calling Voronov "the squad's weakest link" and that "he may have cost us the game." Voronov was scratched for game 2 of the Renegades/Admirals series and only returned to the lineup for one additional game during the series.

Despite a poor playoff series against the Renegades during his rookie season, Voronov was reassigned to the Penguins to the Las Vegas Thunder of the International Hockey League to replace Kevin Dahl, who had been recently recalled by the Phoenix Coyotes and were the primary affiliate of the Thunder. General Manager Bob Strumm said he liked the addition of Voronov, saying that he added a "hacking and whacking element that had been missing since the trade of Jeff Ricciardi." While assigned to the Thunder, Voronov was reunited with former Dynamo teammate Alexei Yashin, who were on the same team during the 1992-93 season. Voronov remained with the Thunder for the remainder of the season, scoring six points in 40 games but did not play any games in the postseason. After two seasons in the North American minor leagues, Voronov returned to Russia.

Voronov spent the next 10 out of his 11 seasons in Russia, including four seasons in the Russian Superleague, where he won a championship with the Metallurg Magnitogorsk during the 2000-01 season. He joined Titan Klin of the VHL in 2004 and remained with the team until his retirement in 2008.

Since his retirement, Voronov became an assistant coach with HC MVD and later became head coach of Buran Voronezh.

Notable achievements
2000-01, Russian Superleague champion

Career statistics

References

External links
 

1971 births
Cleveland Lumberjacks players
Dizel Penza players
Hampton Roads Admirals players
HC Dynamo Moscow players
HC Milano players
HC Sibir Novosibirsk players
Krylya Sovetov Moscow players
Las Vegas Thunder players
Living people
Metallurg Magnitogorsk players
Russian expatriate sportspeople in the United States
Russian expatriate sportspeople in Italy
Russian ice hockey defencemen
HC Slovan Bratislava players
Ice hockey people from Moscow
Pittsburgh Penguins draft picks
Russian people of Ukrainian descent
Severstal Cherepovets players
Soviet ice hockey defencemen
Expatriate ice hockey players in the United States
Expatriate ice hockey players in Slovakia
Expatriate ice hockey players in Italy
Russian expatriate sportspeople in Slovakia